The 1911 Lehigh Brown and White football team was an American football team that represented Lehigh University as an independent during the 1911 college football season. In its second and final season under head coach Howard R. Reiter, the team compiled a 5–5–1 record and outscored opponents by a total of 91 to 82. The team played its home games at Lehigh Field in South Bethlehem, Pennsylvania.

Schedule

References

Lehigh
Lehigh Mountain Hawks football seasons
Lehigh football